Rosa Fogo (lit. The Fire of the Rose) is a Portuguese soap opera that aired on SIC from September 2011 to June 2012. Below is a list of cast members, main actors of the production.

Cast
Cláudia Vieira
Ângelo Rodrigues
José Fidalgo
Rogério Samora

Awards and nominations

References

External links

2011 telenovelas
2011 Portuguese television series debuts
2012 Portuguese television series endings
Portuguese telenovelas
Sociedade Independente de Comunicação telenovelas
Portuguese-language telenovelas